Rahul Raj Mayer, (born 20 July 1996 in Kuala Lumpur) is a Malaysian racing driver.

Career
Mayer was born in Selangor, Malaysia. In 2007 at the age of eleven he began his karting career. Starting his official racing career in 2008 he came in 3rd in the Yamaha SL Cup (Junior) series. 

In 2009 he came in 2nd in the Asian Karting Open Championship (Formula 125 Junior Open). In 2010 he came in 2nd for the Yamaha SL Cup (Senior) and 3rd for the Rotax Max Challenge Malaysia (Junior) series. 

In 2011 he raced in Japan in the Iame X30 Championship where  he came in 8th. In 2012 he competed in the All Stars Karting Invitational (KF2) and Rotax Invitational Race (Rotax Senior) and came in 3rd and 2nd respectively.

In 2012 he competed in single seater racing, starting his career in the Formula Gulf 1000 (FG1000) Championship where after two wins, ten podiums, a Pole Position and three fastest laps he ended the year 2nd place in the Championship. 

In 2013 Mayer travelled to the UK to compete in the BRDC Formula 4 Series with team Hillspeed Racing. He completed the year in 17th place.

In 2014, again with Hillspeed and with more experience, he competed in BRDC Formula 4 and ended the year in 12th place..

In 2015 Mayer was signed to Mark Burdett Motorsport and raced in the NEC Formula Renault Monza.

References

1996 births
Living people
Malaysian people of Indian descent
Sportspeople from Kuala Lumpur
Malaysian racing drivers
Mark Burdett Motorsport drivers
Formula Renault 2.0 NEC drivers